Günter Spies (born 22 January 1948) is a German gymnast. He competed in eight events at the 1972 Summer Olympics.

References

External links
 

1948 births
Living people
German male artistic gymnasts
Olympic gymnasts of West Germany
Gymnasts at the 1972 Summer Olympics
People from Emmendingen (district)
Sportspeople from Freiburg (region)